Eva Zetterberg (born 1947) is a Swedish Left Party politician and diplomat.  She served as a member of the Riksdag from 1991 to 2002. She has later been Swedish ambassador in Nicaragua and to Chile.

References

1947 births
Living people
Members of the Riksdag from the Left Party (Sweden)
Women members of the Riksdag
Members of the Riksdag 1991–1994
Members of the Riksdag 1994–1998
Members of the Riksdag 1998–2002
21st-century Swedish women politicians
Ambassadors of Sweden to Nicaragua
Ambassadors of Sweden to Chile
Swedish women ambassadors